The following is a list of television broadcasting licences held by Asian Television Network:

Launched (On the air)
 ATN Aastha TV (Operates as exempt Cat. 2 Ethnic service)
 ATN ARY Digital (Operates as exempt Cat. 2 Ethnic service)
 ATN B4U Movies (ATN Hindi Movie Channel 3)
 ATN B4U Music (ATN- Music Network One (Hindi Music) - AMN1)
 ATN Bangla (Operates as exempt Cat. 2 Ethnic service)
 ATN Brit Asia TV (Operates as exempt Cat. 2 Ethnic service) 
 ATN Channel (SATV)
 ATN Colors Bangla (Operates as exempt Cat. 2 Ethnic service) 
 ATN Colors Marathi (Operates as exempt Cat. 2 Ethnic service) 
 ATN Colors Rishtey (Operates as exempt Cat. 2 Ethnic service)
 ATN Cricket Plus (ATN - Asian Sports Network)
 ATN DD Bharati (Operates as exempt Cat. 2 Ethnic service) 
 ATN DD India (Operates as exempt Cat. 2 Ethnic service) 
 ATN DD News (Operates as exempt Cat. 2 Ethnic service)
 ATN DD Sports (ATN - Cricket Channel I)
 ATN DD Urdu (Operates as exempt Cat. 2 Ethnic service)
 ATN Food Food (ATN South Asian Cooking Channel 1)
 ATN Gujarati (Operates as exempt Cat. 2 Ethnic service)
 ATN IBC Tamil (Operates as exempt Cat. 2 Ethnic service)
 ATN Jaya TV (Operates as exempt Cat. 2 Ethnic service)
 ATN Life (Operates as exempt Cat. 2 Ethnic service)
 ATN Max 2 (Operates as exempt Cat. 2 Ethnic service)
 ATN Movies (ATN Hindi Movie Channel 4)
 ATN MTV India (Operates as exempt Cat. 2 Ethnic service)
 ATN News (ATN South Asian English News Channel 2)
 ATN News18 India (Operates as exempt Cat. 2 Ethnic service)
 ATN PM One (Operates as exempt Cat. 2 Ethnic service)
 ATN Punjabi (Operates as exempt Cat. 2 Ethnic service)
 ATN Punjabi 5 (Operates as exempt Cat. 2 Ethnic service)
 ATN Punjabi Plus (Operates as exempt Cat. 2 Ethnic service)
 ATN SAB TV (ATN Comedy Channel One)
 ATN Sikh Channel (Operates as exempt Cat. 2 Ethnic service) 
 ATN Sony Aath (Operates as exempt Cat. 2 Ethnic service)
 ATN Sony Mix (Operates as exempt Cat. 2 Ethnic service)
 ATN Sony TV (Operates as exempt Cat. 2 Ethnic service)
 ATN SVBC (Operates as exempt Cat. 2 Ethnic service)
 ATN Tamil Plus (Operates as exempt Cat. 2 Ethnic service)
 ATN Times Now (ATN – South Asian News – English)
 ATN Urdu (Operates as exempt Cat. 2 Ethnic service)
 ATN Zoom (ATN – Music Network Two (Hindi Music))
 CBN (ATN Cricket Channel One)

Yet to launch
 ATN Caribbean Channel Two
 ATN Hindi Movie Channel 5
 ATN Urdu News Channel 1

Did not launch (License has expired)
 ATN- Arabic News Channel 
 ATN- Bangla Channel Two
 ATN- Cricket Channel I
 ATN- Cricket Channel II
 ATN Cricket Channel Two
 ATN – Hindi Movie Channel Two
 ATN- Malayalam Channel One 
 ATN- Malayalam Channel Two
 ATN- Music Network Three (Tamil Music) - AMN3
 ATN- Music Network Two (Hindi Music) - AMN2
 ATN- South Asian News- Hindi (Pay service)
 ATN- South Asian News- Hindi/English (Pay service)
 ATN – South Asian News – Hindi
 ATN – South Asian News – Hindi/English
 ATN- South Asian News - Tamil
 ATN- Urdu Channel Two
 ATN- Urdu Channel Three
 Hindi Movie Channel
 Telugu Channel

Lists of television channels